Tulipalin A, also known as α-methylene-γ-butyrolactone, is a naturally occurring compound found in certain flowers such as tulips and alstroemerias. Tulipalin A has the molecular formula C5H6O2 and the CAS registry number 547-65-9. It is an allergen and has been known to cause occupational contact dermatitis, i.e. 'tulip fingers,' in some who are commonly exposed to it such as florists. More recent experiments with this compound have uncovered potential applications for it in the field of polymerization.

References 

Gamma-lactones
Plant toxins
Vinylidene compounds